Irvin Talton (full name and places and dates of birth, death, and burial missing) was a Democrat who served from 1880 to 1884 in the Louisiana House of Representatives for Webster Parish in northwestern Louisiana.

Prior to his term in the House, Talton was from 1877 to 1880 a member of the Webster Parish Police Jury, the parish governing body, akin to the county commission in other states. He represented Dubberly, Heflin, and south Webster Parish.

Little else is known of Talton. There were numerous Taltons in south Webster Parish in the late 19th century, some interred at Fellowship Cemetery in Dubberly, but there are no birth, death, or American Civil War records found on Irvin Talton. The state website lists his name erroneously as "Irwin Tarlton."

References

 

 

People from Dubberly, Louisiana
Democratic Party members of the Louisiana House of Representatives
Parish jurors and commissioners in Louisiana
19th-century American politicians
Year of birth missing
Year of death missing